Briolette Kah Bic Runga  (born 13 January 1976), recording as Bic Runga, is a New Zealand singer-songwriter and multi-instrumentalist pop artist. Her first three studio albums debuted at number one on the New Zealand Top 40 Album charts. Runga has also found success internationally in Australia, Ireland and the United Kingdom with her song "Sway".

Early life
Runga was born in Christchurch. Her mother, Sophia Tang, was a Chinese Malaysian lounge singer in Malaysia when she met Joseph Te Okoro Runga, a Māori ex-serviceman. They moved to New Zealand to live. Runga is of Ngāti Kahungunu descent. Regarding her name, she explains: "'You say it Bec, rather than Bic. ... It's Chinese, it's a strange vowel sound which doesn't seem to translate in Australia. It means the colour of jade, which might mean green.'"

Runga grew up in Hornby, Christchurch surrounded by a musically inclined family, and started recording songs with her sisters, Boh and Pearl, when she was four years old. Runga's older sister Boh was the vocalist in the New Zealand rock group Stellar, while Pearl is a session singer.

She learned how to play drums at the age of eleven, and guitar at about fourteen. Runga also learned to play the keyboard around this time. She attended Cashmere High School, joining high school bands and performing with local jazz groups by her mid-teens.

Career

1993–1997: Early career and Drive

Under the name of "Love Soup", Runga and Kelly Horgan entered the 1993 Smokefreerockquest in Christchurch, winning third place and a music contract with Pagan Records. Using a QE II Arts Council grant, Runga recorded the first Drive EP in Wellington. Unsatisfied with the direction that her music was being taken, she moved to Auckland in 1994 and spent a year writing and performing.

In 1995, she sent a new demo of "Drive" to Sony Music, who signed Runga in September of that year and bought her Wellington recordings from Pagan Records. Sony had her re-record the song with more instruments, but it was eventually her demo that was used on the upcoming album. It entered the Top 10 in New Zealand and won her the APRA Silver Scroll award in 1996.

Runga then released "Bursting Through", the first single from her upcoming album, also entitled Drive. The success of the singles led to the release of her debut album, Drive, in 1997. Runga's song "Sway", along with a duet with Dan Wilson of Semisonic called "Good Morning Baby", were used in the films American Pie, and Cruel Intentions. Six singles were released from the album, while "Sway" was released in New Zealand, Australia, the United Kingdom, and Germany.

Runga has recorded two songs called "Drive". The first was her own, which appeared on her debut album of the same name. The second was a 1999 collaboration with fellow New Zealanders Strawpeople, providing guest vocals for their cover of The Cars' classic 1984 hit.

2000–2008: Beautiful Collision and Birds

In 2000, Runga toured with Tim Finn and Dave Dobbyn, resulting in a release of a live album in November 2000, titled Together in Concert: Live. It peaked at number 2 on the New Zealand charts and has been certified 3× platinum. Runga released her second solo album, Beautiful Collision in 2002. It entered the New Zealand charts at number one and has been certified 10× platinum in New Zealand.

Her third studio album, Birds, was released in New Zealand on 28 November 2005. New Zealand artists Neil Finn (piano) and Anika Moa (backing vocals) contributed to the album. The first single, "Winning Arrow", was released on the same day. It was her third consecutive studio album to enter the New Zealand charts at number one. Birds was certified triple platinum.

Runga played a 'Vietnamese lounge singer' in the 2005 film Little Fish, and covered Gene Pitney's "Something's Gotten Hold of My Heart" for the soundtrack. In the 2006 New Year Honours, Runga was appointed a Member of the New Zealand Order of Merit, for services to music.

In November 2008, Runga released Try to Remember Everything which is a collection of unreleased, new and rare Bic Runga recordings from 1996 to 2008. The album was certified Gold in New Zealand on 14 December 2008, selling over 7,500 copies.

2011–2015: Belle and Anthology

Runga contributed to the score and soundtrack to New Zealand filmmaker Roseanne Liang's debut feature film My Wedding and Other Secrets (2011). In addition to featuring "Say After Me" from Birds, the film also included two tracks ("Hello Hello" and "This Girl's Prepared for War") from her fourth album Belle.

Belle was released in November 2011. Runga completed a 17 date tour across New Zealand and 13 dates across Ireland, United Kingdom and Australia.

A greatest hits album, Anthology, was released on 1 December 2012.

In June 2015, Runga released a new single titled "Dreamed a Dream". This was a collaboration with Hollie Fullbrook of Tiny Ruins, with whom she toured New Zealand in June and July 2015. As well as solo performances by both artists, these shows included covers of songs by Simon & Garfunkel, Yoko Ono, Francoise Hardy, Donovan and Fleetwood Mac.

2016–present: Close Your Eyes and New Zealand Music Hall of Fame

In October 2016, it was announced that Runga would release an album of consisting of ten covers and two original tracks titled Close Your Eyes. "Close Your Eyes" was released on 14 October 2016 as a single.

In November 2016, Runga was inducted into the New Zealand Music Hall of Fame. Recorded Music CEO Damian Vaughan said "Bic is one of our most loved and treasured recording artists, her songs are instantly recognizable and have been part of the fabric of New Zealand for more than 20 years. We're honoured to present Bic with the 2016 Legacy Award and induct her into the NZ Music Hall of Fame".

Personal life
Runga's partner is singer Kody Nielson. She has three children: Joe (born 2007), Sophia (born 2013), and Frida (born 2015). She has two sisters who are also musicians, Pearl Runga and Boh Runga.

Honours
In the 2006 New Year Honours Runga was appointed a Member of the New Zealand Order of Merit for services to music.

Discography

Studio albums
 Drive (1997)
 Beautiful Collision (2002)
 Birds (2005)
 Belle (2011)
 Close Your Eyes (2016)

Compilation albums
 Try to Remember Everything (2008)
 Anthology (2012)

Live albums
 Together in Concert: Live  (with Tim Finn and Dave Dobbyn)  (2000)
 Live in Concert with the Christchurch Symphony  (with The Christchurch Symphony)  (2003)

New Zealand Music Awards
The New Zealand Music Awards are presented annually by Recorded Music NZ recognising outstanding artistic and technical achievements in the recording field.

References

External links

AudioCulture profile

Bic Runga at Discogs

1976 births
Living people
20th-century guitarists
20th-century New Zealand women singers
New Zealand Māori women singers
21st-century guitarists
21st-century New Zealand women singers
APRA Award winners
Members of the New Zealand Order of Merit
New Zealand women singer-songwriters
New Zealand people of Chinese descent
New Zealand people of Malaysian descent
Ngāti Kahungunu people
People educated at Cashmere High School
People from Christchurch
Sony Music New Zealand artists
Māori-language singers
20th-century women guitarists
21st-century women guitarists